North Carolina Highway 561 (NC 561) is a  North Carolina state highway and a rural traffic artery connecting Louisburg and Ahoskie with many small-to-medium-sized towns in the Down East and Coastal Plain regions within minutes from the Virginia state line. NC 561 is a spur of NC 56, although the two highways never actually intersect.

Route description

The eastern terminus of NC 561 is at NC 45 in Harrellsville and proceeds west to Ahoskie where it meets with U.S. Route 13 (US 13) and NC 42 just outside town.  All three are concurrent along Memorial Drive upon entering Ahoskie until reaching Academy Street.  From there, NC 42 turns left and the other two highways turn right bypassing downtown Ahoskie to the west.  NC 561 turns left onto West 1st Street, continuing westward towards Rich Square.  There are two junctions along the way (NC 11 and NC 461) before merging with NC 305 near the Hertford/Northampton county line.  The two highways run concurrent into Rich Square, passing NC 35 to junction with US 258. As NC 305 continues straight towards Jackson, NC 561 turns left and joins US 258 at it passes through Rich Square heading south towards Scotland Neck.

The two highways pass NC 308 south of Rich Square on its way into Halifax County, where NC 561 turns right and proceeds towards Halifax meeting NC 481 in Tillery. NC 561 turns right onto US 301, NC 903 and NC 125 just south of Halifax and then turn left a short ways up and continue west towards Brinkleyville. The highway makes a right at Beaver Dam, just before its junction with Interstate 95 (exit 160 off the Interstate). NC 561 meets NC 4 and NC 48 at Brinkleyville, where NC 4 runs concurrent with NC 561 past Medoc Mountain State Park. The highway breaks off heading north to Littleton as NC 561 continues west to Hollister. NC 43 joins the highway past Hollister for a short distance before NC 561 breaks off and travels to Centerville, crossing NC 58 in town.

History
NC 561 was established in 1925 as a new primary route between NC 56 in Louisburg, and NC 58 in Centerville.  Around 1928, NC 561 was extended east as new routing to US 17-1/NC 40 near Halifax.  In 1932, another extension east on new routing to US 258/NC 12 near Spring Hill. Between 1959–1963, NC 561 was extended north along US 258 to Rich Square and then east along NC 305 until past Mintons Store where it split on new primary routing to Ahoskie.  After a short concurrency with both US 13 and NC 45, it traveled east on new primary routing to end at NC 45, near Harrellsville. By 1963, NC 561 discontinued going to Main Street in Louisburg and was truncated at the current western terminus at US 401/NC 39.

Junction list

References

External links

 
 NCRoads.com: N.C. 561

561
Historic Albemarle Tour
Transportation in Franklin County, North Carolina
Transportation in Nash County, North Carolina
Transportation in Halifax County, North Carolina
Transportation in Northampton County, North Carolina
Transportation in Hertford County, North Carolina